Timothy Andrew Fischer  (3 May 1946 – 22 August 2019) was an Australian politician and diplomat who served as leader of the National Party from 1990 to 1999. He was Deputy Prime Minister in the Howard Government from 1996 to 1999.

Fischer was born in Lockhart, New South Wales. He served with the Australian Army in the Vietnam War. On his return he bought a farming property at Boree Creek. He served in the New South Wales Legislative Assembly from 1971 to 1984. Fischer was elected to the House of Representatives at the 1984 election, representing the Division of Farrer until his retirement in 2001. He replaced Charles Blunt as leader of the National Party in 1990, and in the Howard Government served as Deputy Prime Minister and Minister for Trade. After leaving politics, Fischer served as chairman of Tourism Australia from 2004 to 2007, and was later Ambassador to the Holy See from 2009 to 2012.

Early life
Fischer was born on 3 May 1946 in Lockhart, New South Wales. He was the fourth of five children born to Barbara Mary and Julius Ralph Fischer; he was predeceased by an older brother who died of meningitis as an infant. His parents were "from once wealthy Melbourne families whose businesses had collapsed with the onset of the Great Depression". Fischer's father worked as a jackaroo, settling in Boree Creek, New South Wales, in 1936, where he ran a stock and station agency and later bought a small farm. His paternal grandfather was born in Kleve, Germany, and had his assets frozen due to anti-German sentiment during World War I. His paternal grandmother was the daughter of a French seaman. Fischer's mother worked as a nurse prior to her marriage. His maternal grandfather was a Dutch immigrant who married the daughter of Francis Mason, an Irish immigrant who became speaker of the Victorian Legislative Assembly.

Fischer grew up on the family property at Boree Creek and attended Boree Creek Public School for six years. From 1958 he boarded at Xavier College in Melbourne. He graduated in 1963 and won a scholarship to attend university, but returned to Boree Creek to assist his family. In 1966 he was conscripted into the Australian Army and commissioned at the Officer Training Unit, Scheyville. Fischer served with the 1st Battalion, Royal Australian Regiment (1RAR) between July 1966 and March 1969 as a second lieutenant. With his battalion, he served in the Vietnam War. Fischer was wounded in the Battle of Coral-Balmoral in May–June 1968. 1RAR and the 1st Australian Task Force were awarded Unit Citation for Gallantry for their actions Battle of Coral-Balmoral and Fischer was entitled to wear the citation insignia.

Upon his return from Vietnam, Fischer took over the family property at Boree Creek and became active in the Country Party, as the party was then called.

Career

State politics 
Fischer represented Sturt in the New South Wales Legislative Assembly from 1971 to 1980 and Murray from 1980 to 1984. He served on the opposition frontbench from 1978 to 1984.

Federal politics 

In 1984, Fischer won the federal seat of Farrer in the New South Wales far west for the National Party of Australia (NPA), as the Country Party had been renamed. Within a year he was on the opposition frontbench, and soon became a popular figure in both the party and parliament. His sometimes rustic manner and bumbling English concealed a shrewd political brain. In 1990, when an attempt by Charles Blunt to modernise the Nationals' image ended with him losing his own seat, Fischer succeeded him as leader, defeating the former leader Ian Sinclair.

Fischer was an enthusiastic supporter of the "Fightback" package of economic and tax reforms proposed by the Liberal leader John Hewson in 1991. But he was unsuccessful in persuading the majority of rural voters, particularly in Queensland, that the proposed changes, particularly the goods and services tax (GST), were in their interests, and Labor under Paul Keating won the 1993 election. On 23 March 1993, ten days after the election, Ian Sinclair unsuccessfully challenged Fischer for the leadership.

His car T-boned a vehicle that had failed to yield to a give-way sign; the driver and passenger in the other vehicle were killed. Fischer was knocked unconscious in the accident and taken to hospital in Wagga Wagga. He took a month off from politics to aid his recovery, with his deputy John Anderson acting as party leader in his absence.

The Liberals finally regained office under John Howard in 1996. Fischer became Deputy Prime Minister and Minister for Trade. The Liberals had won a majority in their own right in the 1996 election, leaving the Nationals in a much weaker position compared to previous Coalition governments. Nonetheless, Fischer was fairly active. He supported the government introducing tough gun control measures on automatic and semi-automatic weapons following the Port Arthur massacre in April 1996 alongside then-prime minister John Howard, measures which were opposed by much of his party's rural base.

Fischer also had difficulty with the determination of many Liberals, including the Treasurer, Peter Costello, to carry out sweeping free-market reforms, including abolishing tariff protection for rural industries, deregulating petrol prices and implementing other measures which farmers' organisations regarded as harmful to themselves.

In pushing to permanently extinguish native title rights of indigenous Australians following the Mabo and Wik decisions, Fischer attracted much criticism.

Further trouble for Fischer and the Nationals came with the rise of One Nation, a right-wing populist party led by Pauline Hanson, a disendorsed Liberal candidate who was nonetheless elected member for the Queensland seat of Oxley at the 1996 federal election. One Nation had its greatest appeal in country areas of New South Wales and Queensland—the Nationals' traditional heartland. For much of 1997 and 1998, it looked as though One Nation might sweep the Nationals out of existence. In the 1998 election campaign, however, Fischer strongly counter-attacked One Nation, mainly on the grounds of their "flat tax" economic policies, and succeeded in holding the Nationals' losses to one Senate seat in Queensland.

In 2001, shortly before the expiry of his last parliamentary term, Fischer made public his support for an Australian republic in the future.

As an MP, and later as leader of the Nationals, Fischer often had a rather hectic schedule of visits to various rural National branch meetings, and other relevant functions and gatherings. As a result, he earned the affectionate nickname of "Two-Minute Tim" – often he would arrive, speak to the gathering for a few minutes (i.e. the "Two-Minutes"), grab a quick bite to eat while chatting to some of the attendees, then have to head off to the next stop on his schedule.

In 2014 it was revealed on the ABC program A Country Road that sometime before the 1998 federal election, Fischer, then National Party leader, had met with his deputy John Anderson and former minister John Sharp for a luncheon at which they were surprised to learn from each other that they all intended to retire at the forthcoming election. They agreed that it was not a good idea for all of them to retire at the same time, as it could give a negative image to the party which at the time was battling against perceptions that its future was uncertain. In the end, only Sharp retired, with Fischer and Anderson delaying their own retirements and successfully recontesting the election.

In 1999, he surprised his colleagues by resigning as party leader and as a minister, and by announcing that he would retire at the election due in 2001. His decision to quit politics was motivated partly by the demands of his family, in particular that his son Harrison has autism (Fischer himself claimed to have "high functioning" autism, though he was never professionally diagnosed).

Fischer is the only person to have served the entirety of his ministerial career as Deputy Prime Minister.

Post-political career 
After his retirement, he returned to farming at Boree Creek, and became involved in charity work, assisting organisations such as the St Vincent de Paul Society, the Fred Hollows Foundation and Autism New South Wales.

Fischer served as chairman of Tourism Australia from 2004 until 2007. He was made a fellow (FTSE) of the Australian Academy of Technological Sciences and Engineering (ATSE) in 2000. He served as chairman and a patron of the Crawford Fund, an initiative of the ATSE supporting international agricultural research, from 2001 to 2006. He was vice-chair and chair of the Crop Trust (2013–2017) and a "vigorous supporter" of the Svalbard Global Seed Vault. He served as national chairman of the Royal Flying Doctor Service. He also served as founding Patron of Australia for UNHCR (2001-2006), an Australian charity that raises funds for the UN's refugee agency.

Fischer was appointed a Companion of the Order of Australia (AC) in the 2005 Australia Day Honours' List in recognition of his contributions to Australian politics, trade liberalisation, rail transport development, support of humanitarian aid, and to fostering community acceptance of cultural differences.

On 21 July 2008, Fischer was nominated by Prime Minister Kevin Rudd as the first resident Australian Ambassador to the Holy See. Fischer worked closely with the Vatican on all aspects of the canonisation of Australia's first Roman Catholic saint, Mary MacKillop. He retired from the post on 20 January 2012.

In August 2013, following the shooting death of Australian baseball player Christopher Lane in Oklahoma, Fischer called for a tourism boycott of the United States to protest the activities of the National Rifle Association and what he felt were overly lax American gun laws.

Personal life 

In 1992, Fischer married Judy Brewer. They had two sons.

Fischer was noted as a tireless advocate for rail transport and was probably Australia's best known railfan. He had a childhood hobby of studying rail gauges of the world. After retiring from politics he continued his association with rail as special envoy for the Adelaide to Darwin railway line and travelled on the first freight train and first Ghan passenger train to Darwin in 2004. The V class GT46C locomotive V544, owned and operated by Aurizon, is named after him. In 2007 he led the Rail Freight Network Review into rail freight in Victoria, as commissioned by the Victorian Government.

Between 2008 and 2009, Fischer hosted three series of ABC Local Radio podcasts The Great Train Show, covering a wide range of railway topics from around the world and within Australia.

In October 2018, Fischer was diagnosed with acute myeloid leukaemia. He died on 22 August 2019 at the Albury-Wodonga Cancer Centre in East Albury, New South Wales at age 73. Fischer himself attributed the illness to exposure to Agent Orange during his service in Vietnam. Fischer was given a state funeral, which was held in Albury on 29 August 2019.

Honours

Publications

References

Bibliography

External links

Parliament biography
Interview with Tim Fischer by Kerry O'Brien (The 7.30 Report)
Inauguration of Tourism Australia

1946 births
2019 deaths
Ambassadors of Australia to the Holy See
Australian Army soldiers
Australian people of German descent
Australian republicans
Autism activists
Companions of the Order of Australia
Delegates to the Australian Constitutional Convention 1998
20th-century Australian politicians
Deputy Prime Ministers of Australia
Fellows of the Australian Academy of Technological Sciences and Engineering
Knights Grand Cross of the Order of Pope Pius IX
Leaders of the National Party of Australia
Members of the Australian House of Representatives for Farrer
Members of the Australian House of Representatives
Members of the Cabinet of Australia
Members of the New South Wales Legislative Assembly
National Party of Australia members of the Parliament of Australia
National Party of Australia members of the Parliament of New South Wales
People educated at Xavier College
Recipients of the Centenary Medal
21st-century Australian politicians
Government ministers of Australia
Australian health activists
Deaths from acute myeloid leukemia
Recipients of the Unit Citation for Gallantry
Australian Army officers
Deaths from cancer in New South Wales
Australian military personnel of the Vietnam War
Australian people of Dutch descent
Australian people of French descent
Australian people of Irish descent